This list of historical capitals of Vietnam includes former capital cities as well as the current capital of Vietnam which is Hanoi in time order. The capitals in bold indicate those of independent periods while the capitals in italic indicate those of occupied or invaded periods.

Some secondary unofficial capitals also existed throughout Vietnamese history. These secondary capitals were established by dynasty founders merely as symbolic capitals to pay tribute to their ancestors.
 Thiên Trường at Nam Định Province during Trần dynasty, existed along with Thăng Long capital
 Lam Kinh at Thanh Hóa Province during Later Lê dynasty, existed along with Đông Kinh capital 
 Dương Kinh at Hải Phòng City during Mạc dynasty, existed along with Đông Kinh capital 
 Phượng Hoàng Trung Đô at Nghệ An Province during Tây Sơn dynasty, although only in planning and was never completed, existed along with Phú Xuân capital
 Đà Lạt at Lâm Đồng Province during French colonial era as summer capital of Indochinese Federation, existed along with Hanoi capital
 Việt Bắc at northern Vietnam during First Indochina War as Việt Minh's headquarter and de facto capital of Democratic Republic of Vietnam, existed along with de jure Hanoi capital

References

Vietnam history-related lists
Vietnam
Vietnam